Khodahafez Tehran is a 1966 Iranian dramatic-romance film directed by Samuel Khachikian.  It stars Behrouz Vossoughi, Pouri Banayi, and Jalal Pishavian.

Cast

References

1966 films
1966 romantic drama films
Iranian black-and-white films
Iranian romantic drama films
Films directed by Samuel Khachikian